Palatia (minor planet designation: 415 Palatia) is a large main belt asteroid that was discovered by German astronomer Max Wolf on 7 February 1896 in Heidelberg.

10μ radiometric data collected from Kitt Peak in 1975 gave an overly large diameter estimate of 93 km. It has a very low radiometric albedo of 0.026 and the spectrum suggests a metal-rich enstatite composition.

References

External links
 
 

Background asteroids
Palatia
Palatia
DP-type asteroids (Tholen)
18960207